Tubilla del Lago is a municipality located in the province of Burgos, Castile and León, Spain. According to the 2004 census (INE), the municipality had a population of 170 inhabitants.

References

External links
Tubilla del Lago Website about the town

Municipalities in the Province of Burgos